S.M. Abul Kalam Azad is a Bangladesh Nationalist Front politician and a former Member of Parliament from Dhaka-17.

Early life
Azad was born on 1 November 1954. He has completed M.S.S. in political science.

Career
Azad was elected to Parliament from Dhaka-17 in 2014 as a Bangladesh Nationalist Front candidate. His constituency, Dhaka-17, had the lowest voter turnout in the 2014 elections at 6.4 percent. He is the coordinator of Bangladesh Nationalist Front.

References

Bangladesh Nationalist Front politicians
Living people
10th Jatiya Sangsad members
1954 births